Preference is a term used in scientific literature.

Preference may also refer to: 
Preference (economics), as the term is used in economics
Preferans, the Russian version of the card game, Préférence
Préférence, a card game played in Austria, Hungary and the West Balkans
Preferences mag, French gay periodical usually styled PREF mag 
Preferred stock, preference stock or preference shares, a form of corporate equity ownership
Unfair preference, a legal term
In computing, the computer configuration or preferences of the software